2019 Academy Awards may refer to:

 91st Academy Awards, the Academy Awards ceremony that took place in 2019, honoring the best in film for 2018
 92nd Academy Awards, the Academy Awards ceremony that took place in 2020, honoring the best in film for 2019